The 1000 meters distance for men in the 2013–14 ISU Speed Skating World Cup was contested over six races on six occasions, out of a total of six World Cup occasions for the season, with the first occasion taking place in Calgary, Alberta, Canada, on 8–10 November 2013, and the final occasion taking place in Heerenveen, Netherlands, on 14–16 March 2014.

Shani Davis of the United States won the cup, while Denny Morrison of Canada came second, and the defending champion, Kjeld Nuis of the Netherlands, came third.

Top three

Race medallists

Standings 
Standings as of 14 March 2014 (end of the season).

References 

 
Men 1000